John "Jack" Simpson (29 December 1859 – 9 July 1895) was a Scottish professional golfer of the late 19th century.

Simpson was born Earlsferry, Fife, and was one of six golfing brothers. He played his golf out of Carnoustie. He was a powerful but erratic player. He won the 1884 Open Championship at Prestwick with a score of 160 for 36 holes, despite taking a nine at his second hole. He did not have any other high finishes at the Open and concentrated mainly on clubmaking. He was the first professional at Buxton and High Peak Golf Club. He died unmarried of typhoid fever in Edinburgh in 1895.

Major championships

Wins (1)

Results timeline

Note: Simpson played only in The Open Championship.

"T" indicates a tie for a place

References

Further reading

Scottish male golfers
Winners of men's major golf championships
People from Elie and Earlsferry
Sportspeople from Fife
1859 births
1895 deaths